Frank Mwazviita (born 9 November 1998) is a Zimbabwean cricketer. He made his first-class debut on 18 March 2021, for Mountaineers, in the 2020–21 Logan Cup. Prior to his first-class debut, Mwazviita had also played for the Zimbabwe national under-19 cricket team at international level. He made his List A debut on 14 January 2022, for Mountaineers in the 2021–22 Pro50 Championship.

References

External links
 

1998 births
Living people
Zimbabwean cricketers
Mountaineers cricketers
Place of birth missing (living people)